Uraiyur Mudhukootthanar (Tamil: உறையூர் முதுகூத்தனார்), also known as Uraiyur Mudhukootranar, was a poet of the Sangam period, to whom 9 verses of the Sangam literature have been attributed, including verse 39 of the Tiruvalluva Maalai.

Biography
Uraiyur Mudhukootthanar hailed from Uraiyur and was known for his patriotism.

Contribution to the Sangam literature
Uraiyur Mudhukootthanar has penned 9 Sangam verses, including 2 in Kurunthogai, 3 in Agananuru, 1 in Purananuru, and 1 in Tiruvalluva Maalai.

Views on Valluvar and the Kural
Uraiyur Mudhukootthanar opines about Valluvar and the Kural text thus:

See also

 Sangam literature
 List of Sangam poets
 Tiruvalluva Maalai

Notes

References

 

Tamil philosophy
Tamil poets
Sangam poets
Tiruvalluva Maalai contributors